The 1972–73 season was Mansfield Town's 36th season in the Football League and 4th in the Fourth Division, they finished in 6th position with 54 points.

Final league table

Results

Football League Fourth Division

FA Cup

League Cup

Squad statistics
 Squad list sourced from

Notes

References
General
 Mansfield Town 1972–73 at soccerbase.com (use drop down list to select relevant season)

Specific

Mansfield Town F.C. seasons
Mansfield Town